Gansu earthquake may refer to:

1654 Tianshui earthquake
1718 Tongwei–Gansu earthquake
1879 Gansu earthquake
1920 Haiyuan earthquake
2013 Dingxi earthquakes

See also
List of earthquakes in China